En Uyir Kannamma is a 1988 Indian Tamil-language film directed by Sivachandran in his debut. The film stars Prabhu, Radha, Lakshmi and S. S. Chandran. It was released on 15 January 1988.

Plot 

Shanmugasundaram, a lorry cleaner is in love with Kannamma; however unknown to him he had slept with a woman Ammu during a rainy night because he was drunk at that time. Ammu, who turns out to be pregnant, her chastity has been questioned by the village. She dies while giving birth to a girl child. Kannamma hates Shanmuga for committing this mistake. Shanmugam decides to walk on fire to prove his purity. Nallamuthu, Kannamma's fiancé misbehaves with her and she saves Shanmugam from dying of a plan orchestrated by lorry driver Madhavan who was in love with Kannamma wanted to avenge Shanmugam but turns out that both Madhavan and Nallamuthu plotted together to get them united.

Cast 
Prabhu as Shanmugasundaram
Radha as Kannamma
Lakshmi as Ammu
Sivachandran as Madhavan
V. K. Ramasamy as Periyasamy
S. S. Chandran as Panjavarnam
Pandu
Santhana Bharathi as Velayudham
Radha Ravi as Nallamuthu
Delhi Ganesh as Kannamma's father
Jai Ganesh

Production 
En Uyir Kannamma marked the directorial debut of actor Sivachandran.<ref>{{Cite web |last=ராம்ஜி |first=வி. |date=5 May 2020 |title='லட்சுமி ரொம்ப கோபப்படுவாங்க, நிறைய கேள்வி கேப்பாங்க, முதல் படத்துல எதுக்கு ரிஸ்க்னு பயந்தேன். ஆனா... - நடிகர் - இயக்குநர் சிவசந்திரன் மனம் திறந்த பிரத்யேகப் பேட்டி |url=https://www.hindutamil.in/news/blogs/552920-sivachandran-4-rewindwithramji.html |access-date=30 July 2022 |website=Hindu Tamil Thisai |language=ta |archive-date=16 April 2021 |archive-url=https://web.archive.org/web/20210416233303/https://www.hindutamil.in/news/blogs/552920-sivachandran-4-rewindwithramji.html |url-status=live }}</ref>

 Soundtrack 
The music was composed by Ilaiyaraaja, with lyrics by Vaali.

 Reception En Uyir Kannamma was released on 15 January 1988. N. Krishnaswamy of The Indian Express wrote "Sivachandran [..] turns director En Uyir Kannamma. His story for his own film builds up the dramatic tensions and conflicts gradually, and even in conceiving and staging the action he manages to lend a great deal of realism to some scenes". Jayamanmadhan of Kalki'' appreciated Lakshmi's Malayalam-accented Tamil dialogue delivery, the cinematography and the climax.

References

External links 
 

1980s Tamil-language films
1988 directorial debut films
1988 films
Films directed by Sivachandran
Films scored by Ilaiyaraaja